Miss Sweden or Miss Universe Sweden (in Swedish: Fröken Sverige), is the title of the Swedish beauty pageant, qualifying delegates to the Miss Universe competition. In 2009 the pageant renamed as Miss Universe Sweden and the first national final was held on 6 June 2009, the National Day of Sweden. Among the judges were Yvonne Ryding, Miss Universe 1984. The pageant is a late branch of the Miss Sweden contest. The director of the contest is Joakim Granberg of the Starworld Entertainment Corporation.

History

Miss Sweden which ran from 1949 to 2003, introduced by the female magazine VeckoRevyn and later operated by production company Strix in partnership with MTG. The competition qualified delegates to the global contest Miss Universe.

The event was founded by Bonnier Media Group in 1948; the franchise was held from 1949 until 1999 by the magazine VeckoRevyn, and from 2000 to 2004 by the production company Strix. The first Miss Sweden pageant was won by Kerstin Ringberg. Through the years, many of the contestants went on to notable careers in music, acting and modelling, both domestically and internationally, including Anita Ekberg, Mary Stävin, Lena Olin, Jessica Folcker and Victoria Silvstedt.

The event was cancelled after 2004, due to harassment by feminist organizations of the organizers, Strix.

Between 2006 and 2009 Nya Fröken Sverige built for a new era in Sweden. The winner sent to Miss Universe. The franchise holder moved to Miss Universe Sweden which is called as Miss Sweden in modern era since 2009. Beginning in 2012, three winners and two runners-up are selected. The Miss Universe Sweden competes in Miss Universe, the Miss International Sweden goes to compete in Miss International and the Miss Earth Sweden vies in Miss Earth.

Notable winners 

 Hillevi Rombin, lived in Los Angeles, CA.

Format

The year of 1992 was the first time the pageant was broadcast. The promoters were a commercial channel alongside a magazine released for females. The readers picked their favourites and the winner was chosen among a panel of judges. The Miss Universe pageant was shown on Swedish television for the first time ever a few months later.

In 2001, winners were picked via a telephone poll. There was still an acting jury, giving suggestions over whom they might believe be potential for the Miss Universe pageant.

The last winner was crowned in early 2004, with the winner being Katarina Wigander, and she was crowned by Moore! Magazine.

Titleholders

Titleholders under Miss Sweden org.

Miss Universe Sweden

The winner of Miss Sweden represents her country at the Miss Universe. On occasion, when the winner does not qualify (due to age) for either contest, a runner-up is sent. Before renamed as Miss Universe Sweden, the Miss Sweden (Fröken Sverige) will be sending the winner at the Miss Universe pageant.

Miss International Sweden

Miss International Sweden is a beauty pageant for Swedish females where the winner is sent to represent Sweden at the Miss International. In 2011, the second title of Miss Universe Sweden pageant will be awarding as the Miss International Sweden. On occasion, when the winner does not qualify (due to age) for either contest, a runner-up is sent. Before running under Miss Universe Sweden Organization the Miss International Sweden will be selecting by Årent Runt in 1960–1994 and Fashion For Integration in 2000–2008.

See also 
 Miss World Sweden
 Miss Earth Sweden

References

External links
 

Sweden
Sweden
Sweden
Beauty pageants in Sweden
Recurring events established in 1949
Recurring events disestablished in 2004
Honorary titles of Sweden
Swedish awards
Miss Sweden